Tübingen (Swabian: Dibenga) is a traditional university city in central Baden-Württemberg, Germany. As of the 2018/2019 winter semester, 27,665 students attend the Eberhard Karls University of Tübingen. The city has the lowest median age in Germany, in part due to its status as a university city. As of December 31, 2015, the average age of a citizen of Tübingen is 39.1 years. The city is known for its veganism and environmentalism.

Immediately north of the city lies the Schönbuch, a densely wooded nature park.

The Ammer and Steinlach rivers are tributaries of the Neckar river, which flows in an easterly direction through the city, just south of the medieval old town. Large parts of the city are hilly, with the Schlossberg and the Österberg in the city centre and the Schnarrenberg and Herrlesberg, among others, rising immediately adjacent to the inner city.

The geographical centre of the state of Baden-Württemberg is in a small forest called Elysium, near the Botanical Gardens of the city's university.

Regional structure
Tübingen is the capital of an eponymous district and an eponymous administrative region (Regierungsbezirk), before 1973 called Südwürttemberg-Hohenzollern.

Administratively, it is not part of the Stuttgart Region, bordering it to the north and west (Böblingen district). However, the city and northern parts of its district can be regarded as belonging to that region in a wider regional and cultural context.

History

The area was probably first settled by ancient humans in the 12th millennium BC. The Romans left some traces here in AD 85, when they built a limes frontier wall at the Neckar River. Tübingen dates from the 6th or 7th century, when the region was populated by the Alamanni people. Some historians argue that the Battle of Solicinium was fought at Spitzberg, a mountain in Tübingen, in AD 367, although there is no evidence for this.

Tübingen first appears in official records in 1191. The local castle, Hohentübingen, has records going back to 1078, when it was besieged by Henry IV, king of Germany.

From 1146, Count Hugo V (1125–52) was promoted to count palatine as Hugo I. Tübingen was established as the capital of a County Palatine of Tübingen. By 1231, Tübingen was a civitas, indicating recognition by the Crown of civil liberties and a court system.

In 1262, an Augustinian monastery was established by Pope Alexander IV in Tübingen; in 1272, a Franciscan monastery was founded. In 1300, a Latin school (today's Uhland-Gymnasium) was founded. During the Protestant Reformation, which Duke Ulrich of Württemberg converted to, he disestablished the Franciscan monastery in 1535.

In 1342, the county palatine was sold to Ulrich III, Count of Württemberg and incorporated into the County of Württemberg.

Between 1470 and 1483, St. George's Collegiate Church was built. The collegiate church offices provided the opportunity for what soon afterwards became the most significant event in Tübingen's history: the founding of the Eberhard Karls University by Duke Eberhard im Bart of Württemberg in 1477, thus making it one of the oldest universities in Central Europe. It became soon renowned as one of the most influential places of learning in the Holy Roman Empire, especially for theology (a Protestant faculty, Tübinger Stift, was established in 1535 in the former Augustinian monastery). Today, the university is still the biggest source of income for the residents of the city and one of the biggest universities in Germany with more than 26,000 students.

Between 1622 and 1625, the Catholic League occupied Lutheran Württemberg in the course of the Thirty Years' War. In the summer of 1631, the city was raided. In 1635/36 the city was hit by the Plague. In 1638, Swedish troops conquered Tübingen. Towards the end of the war, French troops occupied the city from 1647 until 1649.

In 1789, parts of the old town burned down, but were later rebuilt in the original style. In 1798 the Allgemeine Zeitung, a leading newspaper in early 19th-century Germany, was founded in Tübingen by Johann Friedrich Cotta. From 1807 until 1843, the poet Friedrich Hölderlin lived in Tübingen in a tower overlooking the Neckar.

In the Nazi era, the Tübingen Synagogue was burned in the Kristallnacht on November 9, 1938. The Second World War left the city largely unscathed, mainly because of the peace initiative of a local doctor, Theodor Dobler. It was occupied by the French army and became part of the French zone of occupation. From 1946 to 1952, Tübingen was the capital of the newly formed state of Württemberg-Hohenzollern (as ), before the state of Baden-Württemberg was created by merging Baden, Württemberg-Baden and Württemberg-Hohenzollern. The French troops had a garrison stationed in the south of the city until the end of the Cold War in the 1990s.

In the 1960s, Tübingen was one of the centres of the German student movement and the Protests of 1968 and has ever since shaped left and green political views. Some radicalized Tübingen students supported the leftist Rote Armee Fraktion terrorist group, with active member Gudrun Ensslin, a local and a Tübingen student from 1960 to 1963, joining the group in 1968.

Although noticing such things today is largely impossible, as recently as the 1950s, Tübingen was a very socioeconomically divided city, with poor local farmers and tradesmen living along the Stadtgraben (City Canal) and students and academics residing around the Alte Aula and the Burse, the old university buildings. There, hanging on the Cottahaus, a sign commemorates Goethe's stay of a few weeks while visiting his publisher. The German tendency to memorialize every minor presence of its historical greats (comparable to the statement "Washington slept here" in the United States) is parodied on the building next door. This simple building, once a dormitory, features a plain sign with the words "Hier kotzte Goethe" (lit.: "Goethe puked here").

In the second half of the 20th century, Tübingen's administrative area was extended beyond what is now called the "core city" to include several outlying small towns and villages.

Overview
, the city had 90.000 inhabitants. Life in the city is dominated by its roughly 28.000 students. Tübingen is best described as a mixture of old and distinguished academic flair, including liberal and green politics on one hand and traditional German-style student fraternities on the other, with rural-agricultural environs and shaped by typical Lutheran-Pietist characteristics, such as austerity and a Protestant work ethic, and traditional Swabian elements, such as frugality, order, and tidiness. The city is home to many picturesque buildings from previous centuries and lies on the River Neckar.

, the German weekly magazine Focus published a national survey according to which Tübingen had the highest quality of life of all cities in Germany. Factors taken into consideration included the infrastructure, the integration of bicycle lanes into the road system, a bus system connecting surrounding hills and valleys, late-night services, areas of the city that can be reached on foot, the pedestrianised old town, and other amenities and cultural events offered by the university. Tübingen is the city with the youngest average population in Germany.

Main sights
In central Tübingen, the Neckar divides briefly into two streams, forming the elongated Neckarinsel (Neckar Island), famous for its Platanenallee with high plane trees, which are around 200 years old. Pedestrians can reach the island via stairs on the narrow ends leading down from a bridge spanning the Neckar. During the summer, the Neckarinsel is occasionally the venue for concerts, plays, and literary readings. The row of historical houses across one side of the elongated Neckarinsel is called the Neckarfront and includes the house with adjoining tower where poet Friedrich Hölderlin stayed for the last 36 years of his life, as he struggled with mental instability.

 

Tübingen's Altstadt (old town) survived the World War II due to the city's lack of heavy industry. The result is a growing domestic tourism business as visitors come to wander through one of the few completely intact historic Altstädte in Germany. The highlights of Tübingen include its crooked cobblestone lanes, narrow-stair alleyways picking their way through the hilly terrain, streets lined with canals, and well-maintained traditional half-timbered houses.

Old city landmarks include the city hall on Markt Square and the Hohentübingen Castle, now part of the University of Tübingen. The central landmark is the Stiftskirche (Collegiate Church). Along with the rest of the city, the Stiftskirche was one of the first to convert to Martin Luther's protestant church. As such, it maintains (and carefully defends) several "Roman Catholic" features, such as patron saints. Below the Rathaus is a quiet, residential street called the Judengasse, the former Jewish neighborhood of Tübingen until the city's Jews were expelled in 1477. On the street corner is a plaque commemorating the fate of Tübingen's Jews.

The centre of Tübingen is the site of weekly and seasonal events, including regular market days on the Holzmarkt by the Stiftskirche and the Marktplatz by the Rathaus, an outdoor cinema in winter and summer, festive autumn and Christmas markets and (formerly) Europe's largest Afro-Brazilian festival.

Students and tourists also come to the Neckar River in the summer to visit beer gardens or go boating in Stocherkähne, the Tübingen equivalent of Oxford and Cambridge punts, only slimmer. A Stocherkahn carries up to 20 people. On the second Thursday of June, all Stocherkahn punts take part in a major race, the Stocherkahnrennen.

Bebenhausen Abbey lies in the village of Bebenhausen, a district of Tübingen. A subdivision of the pilgrimage route known as the Way of St. James starts here and runs through Tübingen.

Culture
Tübingen has a notable arts culture as well as nightlife. In addition to the full roster of official and unofficial university events that range from presentations by the university's official poet in residence to parties hosted by the student associations of each faculty, the city can boast of several choirs, theatre companies and nightclubs. Also, Tübingen's Kunsthalle (art exhibition hall), on the "Wanne", houses two or three exhibits of international note each year.

Events
There are several festivals, open air markets and other events on a regular basis:

 January
 Arab Movie Festival Arabisches Filmfestival
 April
 Latin American Movie Festival CineLatino (usually in April or May)
 May 
 Internationales Pianisten-Festival (international festival of pianists) 
 Rock Festival Rock im Tunnel (usually in May or June)
 June   
 Poled boat race, second Thursday of June, 2pm, around the Neckar Island 
 Ract!festival, an alternative open air festival for free with music performances and workshops
 Tübinger Wassermusik: concerts on Stocherkahn boats
 July 
 Stadtfest: gastronomy and performances in the streets of the old town 
 Tübinger Sommerinsel festival: various restaurants serving special meals and associations offering activities on the Neckar Island 
 August 
 Tübinger Orgelsommer: organ concerts in the Stiftskirche 
 Sommerkonzerte in the former monastery of Bebenhausen (July-September) 
 Kennen Sie Tübingen? (Do you know Tübingen?): special guided tours on Mondays July-September 
 September 
 Vielklang: classic music concerts at several locations 
 Umbrisch-Provenzalischer Markt, open air market for Italian and French products from Umbria and Provence 
 Tübinger Stadtlauf the city 10km race
 Retromotor oldtimer festival (usually second or third September weekend)
 October
 Jazz- und Klassiktage: jazz and classic music festival
 Kite festival Drachenfest on the Österberg hill (usually third Sunday in October)
 French movie festival Französische Filmtage
 November
 Terre de femmes movie festival FrauenWelten
December
 Nikolauslauf half marathon outside Tübingen in the forest
 Die Feuerzangenbowle film and large amount of Feuerzangenbowle drink made in a public square
 Chocolate festival chocolART
 Christmas market

Districts

Tübingen is divided into 22 districts, the city core of twelve districts (population of about 51,000) and ten outer districts (suburbs) (population of about 31,000):

Core city districts:

 Französisches Viertel
 Österberg
 Schönblick/Winkelwiese
 Lustnau
 Südstadt
 Universität
 Waldhäuser Ost
 Wanne
 Weststadt
 Zentrum

Outer districts:

 Ammerbuch
 Bebenhausen
 Bühl
 Derendingen
 Hagelloch
 Hirschau
 Kilchberg
 Pfrondorf
 Unterjesingen
 Weilheim, Baden-Württemberg

Population

Population development
Since World War II, Tübingen's population has almost doubled from about 45,000 to the current 88,000, also due to the incorporation of formerly independent villages into the city in the 1970s.

Currently, Lord Mayor Boris Palmer (Green Party) has set the ambitious goal of increasing the population of Tübingen to 100,000 within the next several years. To achieve this, the city is closing gaps between buildings within the city proper by allowing new houses to be built there; this is also to counter the tendency of urban sprawl and land consumption that has been endangering the preservation of rural landscapes of Southern Germany.

Historical population

Climate

Twin towns – sister cities

Tübingen is twinned with:

 Monthey, Switzerland (1959)
 Aix-en-Provence, France (1960)
 Kingersheim, France (1963)
 Ann Arbor, United States (1965)
 Durham, England, UK (1969)
 Aigle, Switzerland (1973)
 Kilchberg, Switzerland (1981)
 Perugia, Italy (1984)
 Petrozavodsk, Russia (1989)
 Villa El Salvador, Peru (2006)
 Moshi, Tanzania (2014)

For their commitment to their international partnership, the Council of Europe awarded the Europe Prize to Tübingen and Aix-en-Provence in 1965. The city's dedication to a European understanding is also reflected in the naming of several streets and squares, including the large Europaplatz (Europe Square) outside the railway station.

Infrastructure

By automobile: Tübingen is on the Bundesstraße 27 (a "federal road") that crosses through Baden-Württemberg, connecting the city with Würzburg, Heilbronn, Stuttgart and the Landesflughafen (Stuttgart Airport) to the north and Rottweil and Donaueschingen to the south.

By rail: Tübingen Hauptbahnhof is on the regional train line Neckar-Alb Railway-Bahn (Neckar-Alb-Bahn) from Stuttgart Hauptbahnhof via Esslingen and Reutlingen to Tübingen. The average time of travel to Stuttgart is 1:01 hrs., with some trains taking only 45 mins. Other regional lines are the Hohenzollerische Landesbahn, connecting the city with Hechingen and Sigmaringen (so-called Zollernalb Railway), Zollernalbbahn and connections to Herrenberg (Ammer Valley Railway, Ammertalbahn) and Horb (Upper Neckar Railway, Obere Neckarbahn). Since 2009, there is also a daily direct Intercity link to Mannheim, Cologne and Düsseldorf as well as to Berlin.

Local public transport: The city, due to its high student population, features an extensive public bus network with more than 20 lines connecting the city districts and places outside of Tübingen such as Ammerbuch, Gomaringen and Nagold. There are also several night bus lines in the early hours every day. A direct bus is available to Stuttgart Airport (via Leinfelden-Echterdingen) as well as to Böblingen and Reutlingen.

Sport
Tigers Tübingen are the city's only professional sports team, playing basketball.

Education

Higher education and research

The Eberhard Karls University of Tübingen dates from 1477, making it one of the oldest in Germany. Including the university hospitals, it is also the city's largest employer. The town is also host to several research institutes including the Max Planck Institutes for Biological Cybernetics, Developmental Biology, Intelligent Systems, The Friedrich Miescher Laboratory of the MPG, and the Max Planck Institute for Biology, the Hertie Institute for Clinical Brain Research, the Werner Reichardt Centre for Integrative Neuroscience and many others. A modern technology park is growing in the northern part of the city, where science, industrial companies and start-ups are conducting joint research, primarily on biotechnology and artificial intelligence. The university also maintains an excellent botanical garden, the Botanischer Garten der Universität Tübingen. Furthermore, there is a Protestant College of Church Music.

Schools
More than 10,000 children and young adults in Tübingen regularly attend school. There are 30 schools in the city, some of which consist of more than one type of school. Of these, 17 are primary schools while the others are for secondary education: four schools are of the lowest rank, Hauptschule, three of the middle rank, Realschule, and six are Gymnasien (grammar schools). There also are four vocational schools (Berufsschule) and three special needs schools.

Primary schools
 Freie Aktive Schule Tübingen
 Grundschule Innenstadt / Silcherschule
 Grundschule Weilheim
 Ludwig-Krapf-Schule
 Grundschule Hügelstraße
 Französische Schule
 Dorfackerschule Lustnau
 Grundschule Hirschau
 Grundschule Hechinger Eck
 Grundschule auf der Wanne
 Grundschule Aischbach
 Grundschule Winkelwiese / Waldhäuser Ost
 Grundschule Bühl
 Grundschule Bühl
 Grundschule Kilchberg
 Grundschule Hagelloch
 Grundschule Pfrondorf
 Grundschule Unterjesingen

Hauptschulen
 Dorfackerschule Lustnau
 Mörikeschule
 Geschwister-Scholl-Schule
 Hauptschule Innenstadt

Realschulen
 Walter-Erbe-Realschule
 Albert-Schweitzer-Realschule
 Geschwister-Scholl-Schule

Gymnasien
 Carlo-Schmid-Gymnasium
 Geschwister-Scholl-Schule
 Kepler-Gymnasium
 Uhland-Gymnasium
 Wildermuth-Gymnasium
 Freie Waldorfschule

Vocational schools (Berufsschulen)
 Gewerbliche Schule
 Wilhelm-Schickard-Schule
 Mathilde-Weber-Schule
 Bildungs- und Technologiezentrum

Notable people

Primož Trubar (1508–1586), Protestant Reformer of the Lutheran tradition, lived and died here
Christopher Besoldus (1577–1638), lawyer and publicist 
Johann Georg Gmelin (1709–1755), naturalist and botanist, explorer of Siberia 
Philipp Friedrich Gmelin (1721–1768), botanist and chemist 
Johann Friedrich Cotta (1764–1832), publisher of many important writers of his time such as Goethe and Schiller, industrial pioneer and politician 
Ferdinand Gottlieb von Gmelin (1782–1848), physician
Ludwig Uhland (1787–1862), poet and philologist, lawyer and politician, lived and died here 
Friedrich Silcher (1789–1860), composer, lived and died here
Christian Gottlob Gmelin (1792–1860), chemist
Hermann Hesse (1877–1962), poet, novelist and painter, worked here as a bookseller trainee in 1895–1899, later Nobel laureate for literature 
Ernst Fritz Schmid (1904–1960), musicologist and Mozart scholar 
Geoffrey Elton (1921–1994), political and historian
Felicia Langer (1930–2018), attorney and human rights activist, lived and died here
Helmut Haussmann (born 1943), academic and politician
Hans-Peter Uhl (1944–2019), politician
Hartmut Zinser (born 1944), scholar and religionist
Eva Haule (born 1954), former leftist terrorist
Dieter Baumann (born 1965), track and field athlete, Olympic winner, lives here
Sigi Schmid (1953–2018), football coach
Vera Wülfing-Leckie (1954–2021), homeopath and translator
Matthias Untermann (born 1956), art historian and archaeologist 
Viola Vogel (born 1959), biophysicist and bioengineer
Michael Theurer (born 1967), politician
Despina Vandi (born 1969), singer
Clemens Schick (born 1972), actor
Boris Palmer (born 1972), current Lord Mayor
Benjamin Heisenberg (born 1974), film director and screenwriter
Sung Yu-ri (born 1981), actress 
Thilo Kehrer (born 1996), football player (national team) 
Amelie Berger (born 1999), handball player (national team)

Associated with the university
 
Johann Reuchlin (1455–1522), Catholic humanist and scholar of Greek and Hebrew 
Philip Melanchthon (1497–1560), Lutheran reformer
Johannes Kepler (1571–1630), astronomer, mathematician, and astrologer
Wilhelm Schickard (1592–1635), professor of Hebrew and astronomy, inventor of the world's first mechanical calculator in 1623, lived and died here 
Rudolf Jakob Camerarius (1655–1721), botanist and professor, proved for the first time the sexual reproduction of plants 
Christoph Martin Wieland (1733–1813), classical writer of the Enlightenment 
J. G. Friedrich von Bohnenberger (1765–1835), pioneer of a modern geodesy, inventor of the gyroscope 
Georg Wilhelm Friedrich Hegel (1770–1831), philosopher of Idealism 
Friedrich Hölderlin (1770–1843), poet and philosopher, lived and died here
Friedrich Wilhelm Joseph Schelling (1775–1854), philosopher of Idealism 
Friedrich List (1789–1846), economist, university professor 
Ferdinand Christian Baur (1792–1860), Protestant theologian, lived and died here
Immanuel Hermann Fichte (1796–1879), philosopher, held a chair of philosophy at the university 
Wilhelm Hauff (1802–1827), writer of the early Romantic period 
Eduard Mörike (1804–1875), Lutheran pastor, poet and writer of the Romantic period 
David Strauss (1808–1874), Protestant theologian and writer 
Georg Herwegh (1817–1875), poet, revolutionist 
Felix Hoppe-Seyler (1825–1895), principal founder of the disciplines of biochemistry and molecular biology, discoverer of the blood pigment hemoglobin 
Lothar Meyer (1830–1895), chemist,  one of the founders of the periodic table of chemical elements alongside Dmitri Mendeleev 
Friedrich Miescher (1844–1895), physician and biologist, discoverer of the nucleic acid as a precondition for the identification of DNA 
Ferdinand Braun (1850–1918), inventor, professor, later Nobel laureate for physics 
Carl Correns (1864–1933), botanist and geneticist 
Alois Alzheimer (1864–1915), psychiatrist and neuropathologist 
Gerhard Anschütz (1867–1948), jurisprudent
Albert Schweitzer (1875–1965), theologian, writer, humanitarian, philosopher and physician, Nobel laureate for peace 
Ernst Bloch (1885–1977), philosopher, lived and died here 
Kurt Georg Kiesinger (1904–1988), politician, Chancellor of Germany, lived and died here 
Dietrich Bonhoeffer (1906–1945), Lutheran theologian and pastor, anti-Nazi-dissident, studied here 
Hans Mayer (1907–2001), literary scholar and critic, lived and died here 
Walter Jens (1923–2013), philologist, writer and university professor of rhetoric,  lived and died here 
Martin Walser (born 1927), writer, studied here 
Pope Benedict XVI (born 1927), held a chair of dogmatic theology at the university 
Hans Küng (1928–2021), Roman-Catholic theologian and author, professor of theology, critic of the official church, creator of Foundation for a Global Ethic (Stiftung Weltethos), lived and died here 
Ralf Dahrendorf (1929–2009), held a chair of sociology 
Manfred Korfmann (1942–2005), archeologist and professor, excavator of ancient Troy 
Christiane Nüsslein-Volhard (born 1942), developmental biologist and Nobel laureate, lives here 
Horst Köhler (born 1943), politician, President of Germany 2004–2010

See also
Deutsch-Amerikanisches Institut Tübingen
Tübingen Tarock, a form of Tarot game from Tübingen

References

External links

 
Eberhard Karls University 

 
Former states and territories of Baden-Württemberg
Tübingen (district)
Württemberg
Populated places on the Neckar basin
Populated riverside places in Germany
Towns in Baden-Württemberg